Blinatumomab, sold under the brand name Blincyto, is a biopharmaceutical medication used as a second-line treatment for Philadelphia chromosome-negative relapsed or refractory acute lymphoblastic leukemia. It belongs to a class of constructed monoclonal antibodies, bi-specific T-cell engagers (BiTEs), that exert action selectively and direct the human immune system to act against tumor cells. Blinatumomab specifically targets the CD19 antigen present on B cells.  In December 2014, it was approved by the US Food and Drug Administration under the accelerated approval program; marketing authorization depended on the outcome of clinical trials that were ongoing at the time of approval.

Blinatumomab is given as a continuous IV infusion for 28 consecutive days per cycle. The dose depends on a patient's actual body weight. Patients weighing over 45 kg should receive fixed doses while patients weighing less than 45 kg should receive doses based on their estimated body surface area.

Medical use 
Blinatumomab was originally approved to treat Philadelphia chromosome-negative relapsed or refractory B-cell precursor acute lymphoblastic leukemia in adults and children. It is approved by the US Food and Drug Administration (FDA) for B-cell precursor acute lymphoblastic leukemia (ALL) in first or second complete remission with minimal residual disease greater than or equal to 0.1% as well as relapsed or refractory B-cell precursor ALL.

Mechanism of action 

Blinatumomab is a bispecific T-cell engager (BiTE). It enables a patient's T cells to recognize malignant B cells. A molecule of blinatumomab combines two binding sites: a CD3 site for T cells and a CD19 site for the target B cells. CD3 is part of the T cell receptor. The drug works by linking these two cell types and activating the T cell to exert cytotoxic activity on the target cell.  CD3 and CD19 are expressed in both pediatric and adult patients, making blinatumomab a potential therapeutic option for both pediatric and adult populations.

History 
The drug (originally known as MT103) was developed by a German-American company Micromet, Inc. in cooperation with Lonza; In 2012, Micromet was purchased by Amgen, which furthered the drug's clinical trials.

In July 2014, the FDA granted breakthrough therapy status to blinatumomab for the treatment of acute lymphoblastic leukemia (ALL). In October 2014, Amgen's Biologics License Application for blinatumomab was granted priority review designation by the FDA, thus establishing a deadline of 19 May 2015, for completion of the FDA review process.

On 3 December 2014, the drug was approved for use in the United States to treat Philadelphia chromosome-negative relapsed or refractory acute lymphoblastic leukemia under the FDA's accelerated approval program; marketing authorization depended on the outcome of clinical trials that were ongoing at the time of approval.

Cost
At the time of initial approval, only about 1,000 patients in the US had an indication for blinatumomab.

A representative of Amgen said, "The price of Blincyto reflects the significant clinical, economic and humanistic value of the product to patients and the health-care system. The price also reflects the complexity of developing, manufacturing and reliably supplying innovative biologic medicines."

References

External links 
 

Breakthrough therapy
Immunology
Monoclonal antibodies for tumors